The Klang River is a river which flows through Kuala Lumpur and Selangor in Malaysia and eventually flows into the Straits of Malacca. The Klang River has 11 major tributaries.

Because the river flows through Klang Valley, which is a heavily populated area of more than four million people, it is considerably polluted, because of deep siltation caused by human waste from informal settlers of the riverbank and even from some business establishments without septic tanks or sewage treatment plants and by soil carried by mudflows from mountains. Heavy development has narrowed certain stretches of the river to the point that it resembles a large storm drain in some places. This contributes to flash floods in Kuala Lumpur, especially after heavy rain.

Course 
[
  {
    "type": "ExternalData",
    "service": "geoline",
    "ids": "Q619086",
    "properties": {
      "stroke": "#669999",
      "stroke-width": 6
    }
  },
]
It is joined by 11 major tributaries. These include the Gombak River, Batu River, Kerayong River, Damansara River, Keruh River, Kuyoh River, Penchala River and Ampang River. It flows into the Straits of Malacca to the west.

Places named after the river 

The river's confluence with the Gombak River gave rise to the name of Kuala Lumpur, Malaysia's capital city. Kuala Lumpur means "muddy estuary", and this definition almost applies to the modern time because of siltation mentioned above. It is also thought that Klang town is named after the river.

Cities and towns on its banks 
The river begins in Ampang Jaya, Selangor, then turn down along Ampang–Kuala Lumpur Elevated Highway till the city centre.

Kuala Lumpur is situated at the point where the Gombak River flows into the Klang River. The confluence is located behind Masjid Jamek. It then flows south-west through Brickfields, Bangsar, Lembah Pantai, Old Klang Road and Jalan Puchong, then become the border of Petaling Jaya and Subang Jaya until PJS7, later passing UEP Subang Jaya, before making a U-turn in Puchong and Putra Heights.

Further downstream, the river flows through Selangor's state capital, Shah Alam. Klang city is situated on the lower stretches of the river.

Malaysia's biggest sea port, Port Klang, is also situated at the estuary of the Klang River.

Dams 

There are two major dams upstream of the river; Batu Dam and Klang Gates Dam, which provide water supply to the people of Klang Valley and mitigate floods.

Privatisation 

The maintenance of the Klang River was privatised. Under 30-year concessions, three firms were to manage a river each and ensure cleanliness.

Flood control 

Historically, Kuala Lumpur has often suffered from severe flooding from the river water overflowing the banks. In 1926, a particularly severe flood hit Kuala Lumpur, and work on the river then began in an attempt to reduce the risk of flooding. Part of the Klang River below the Gombak-Klang confluence was straightened, a channel (part of which runs beside the present Jalan Syed Putra) with flood retention banks was dug to divert the river. This project was completed in 1932.

Kuala Lumpur Flood Mitigation 

Efforts in controlling flood water is continuing process. Kuala Lumpur Flood Mitigation is a project to mitigate flash floods affecting Kuala Lumpur. In include diverting flood water from the Gombak River into a few stormwater ponds located in Batu, Jinjang and Kepong.

SMART Tunnel 

The SMART Tunnel (Stormwater Management and Road Tunnel) is part of Kuala Lumpur Flood Mitigation Project and functions to reduce both traffic congestion and flooding. It is a submerged tunnel which can carry both vehicular traffic as well as storm runoff on a lower level. When regular drainage infrastructure is overwhelmed, vehicles are evacuated from the tunnel and the entire tube is used as a gigantic storm drain to prevent Kuala Lumpur from flooding. It diverts water flow from the Kampung Berembang Lake, near the Klang River, to Taman Desa Lake, which is near the Kerayong River (one of the Klang River's tributaries). Water flow can also go the opposite direction, from the Kerayong River to the Klang River. SMART opened in May 2007.

Clean up efforts

In 2010 Selangor has a stimulus bill that included money to help rehabilitate it. The river's condition has been described as "between critical and bad" by Gareth Jones of Wessex Water, a UK-based company that is participating in the project. Kamal Zaharin, the project mastermind, states that the plans include river cleaning, new source of drinking water, environmental protection, flood mitigation, commercial, tourism and land development activities. Gareth Jones also stated that they plan on tapping groundwater in order to have a source of water that is not the sea.

The project has been estimated to require 15 years and attract 15 billion dollars of investment.

See also
Water supply and sanitation in Malaysia

References 

 
Rivers of Kuala Lumpur
Rivers of Selangor
Nature sites of Selangor
Rivers of Malaysia